Zihuatanejo de Azueta is a municipality located on the Pacific coast in the western part of the Mexican state of Guerrero. It includes the major resort communities of Zihuatanejo and Ixtapa in addition to numerous other towns. In 2010 it had a population of 118,211 inhabitants. It has an area of 1468 km² (567 sq mi). Its municipal seat is the city of Zihuatanejo. Its municipal president for the 2005-08 period was Silvano Blanco Deaquino.

Overview
It was created on 23 December 1953 and named in honour of Lt. José Azueta, a hero of the 1914 United States occupation of Veracruz.

Major communities
El Coacoyul
Ixtapa
Pantla
San José Ixtapa (Barrio Viejo)
Zihuatanejo

See also 
 Mexican Federal Highway 200

References

Link to tables of population data from Census of 2005 INEGI: Instituto Nacional de Estadística, Geografía e Informática
Guerrero Enciclopedia de los Municipios de México

External links

 Municipio de Zihuatanejo de Azueta official website

Municipalities of Guerrero